Whitaker Brook flows into the West Branch Delaware River by Hale Eddy, New York.

References

Rivers of New York (state)
Rivers of Delaware County, New York
Tributaries of the West Branch Delaware River